Turbo argyrostomus, common name the silver-mouthed turban, is a species of sea snail, marine gastropod mollusk in the family Turbinidae.

Subspecies
Two subspecies have been recognized :
 Turbo argyrostomus argyrostomus Linnaeus, 1758 (synonyms : Turbo argentata Röding, 1798 ; Turbo argenteus Anton, 1839 ; Turbo canaliculatus Gmelin, 1791; Turbo carduus P. Fischer, 1873; Turbo ferrugineus Anton, 1839 ; Turbo permundus Iredale, 1929; Turbo princeps Philippi, 1846; Turbo psittacinus Philippi, 1846; Turbo semicostatus Pease, 1861) : this subspecies has been placed by same authors in the subgenus Turbo (Marmarostoma)
 Turbo argyrostomus argyrostomus f. carduus P. Fischer, 1873
 Turbo argyrostomus perspeciosus (Iredale, 1929): (synonym : Turbo speciosus Reeve, 1848) : this subspecies has been placed by same authors in the subgenus Turbo (Marmarostoma)
Subspecies brought into synonymy
 Turbo argyrostomus lajonkairii (Deshayes, 1839): this subspecies has been placed by same authors in the subgenus Turbo (Marmarostoma) : synonym of Turbo lajonkairii (Deshayes, 1839)
 Turbo argyrostomus sandwicensis (Pease, 1861): this subspecies has been placed by same authors in the subgenus Turbo (Marmarostoma) : synonym of Turbo sandwicensis (Pease, 1861)

Description
This species grows to a length of up to 9 cm. The solid, large shell has an ovate-pointed shape. This is a very variable species. The color pattern of the shell is cream, irregularly maculated with greenish and brown, and broken lines of black. The apex is almost always pink. The six whorls are convex, separated by subcanaliculate sutures. The upper two whorls are smooth, the lower spirally lirate and radiately more or less squamose striate. The lirae are sometimes subequal and nearly smooth. The main body whorl has 20 distinct spiral ribs, mostly flat-topped, some with fluted scales. The body whorl contains about thirteen lirae, which are generally wider than their interstices, and of which the subcoronal and one or two median ones are more prominent. The penultimate and last whorl bear numerous elevated vaulted scales upon the lirae. The aperture is pearly white or brownish tinted within, about half the length of the shell. It is round-ovate, angled above, dilated and subchannelled below. The columella is thickened, somewhat flattened and grooved below the narrow deeply perforating umbilicus. T

The operculum is flat inside with 5 whorls. Its nucleus is situated one-third the distance across the face. The outer surface is convex, with coarse obtuse granules, which are largest upon the higher part, nearly surrounded by a marginal series of fine oblique wrinkles. The color is white, more or less tinged with flesh color upon the outer half, and with a narrow marginal orange line.

Distribution
This species and its subspecies are distributed in the Red Sea and in the tropical Indo-West Pacific off Aldabra, Chagos, Madagascar, the Mascarene Basin, Mozambique and Tanzania; off Andaman Islands and Nicobar Islands, East India, the Philippines; off Australia (Northern Territory, Queensland, Western Australia).

References

 Linnaeus, C. 1758. Systemae naturae per regna tria naturae, secundum classes, ordines, genera, species, cum characteribus, differetiis, synonymis, locis.v. Holmiae : Laurentii Salvii 824 pp.
 Gmelin J.F. 1791. Caroli a Linné. Systema Naturae per regna tria naturae, secundum classes, ordines, genera, species, cum characteribus, differentiis, synonymis, locis. Lipsiae : Georg. Emanuel. Beer Vermes. Vol. 1(Part 6) pp. 3021–3910.
 Röding, P.F. 1798. Museum Boltenianum sive Catalogus cimeliorum e tribus regnis naturae quae olim collegerat Joa. Hamburg : Trappii 199 pp
 Schepman, M.M. 1908. Prosobranchia (excluding Heteropoda and parasitic Prosobranchia). Rhipidoglossa and Docoglossa. With an appendix by Prof. R. Bergh [Pectinobranchiata]. Siboga-Expéditie Report 49(1): 1–108, 9 pls.
 Oliver, W.R.B. 1915. The Mollusca of the Kermadec Islands. Transactions of the New Zealand Institute 47: 509-568 
 Wilson, B.R. & Gillett, K. 1971. Australian Shells: illustrating and describing 600 species of marine gastropods found in Australian waters. Sydney : Reed Books 168 pp.
 Cernohorsky, W.O. 1974. Type specimens of Mollusca in the University Zoological Museum Copenhagen. Records of the Auckland Institute and Museum 11: 143-195 
 Salvat, B. & Rives, C. 1975. Coquillages de Polynésie. Tahiti : Papeete les editions du pacifique, pp. 1–391. 
 Drivas, J. & M. Jay (1988). Coquillages de La Réunion et de l'île Maurice
 Wilson, B. 1993. Australian Marine Shells. Prosobranch Gastropods. Kallaroo, Western Australia : Odyssey Publishing Vol. 1 408 pp. 
 Subba Rao, N.V. 2003. Indian Seashells (Part 1). Records of the Zoological Survey of India, Occasional Paper (192): 1-416
 Alf A. & Kreipl K. (2003). A Conchological Iconography: The Family Turbinidae, Subfamily Turbininae, Genus Turbo. Conchbooks, Hackenheim Germany.
 Williams, S.T. (2007). Origins and diversification of Indo-West Pacific marine fauna: evolutionary history and biogeography of turban shells (Gastropoda, Turbinidae). Biological Journal of the Linnean Society, 2007, 92, 573–592.

External links
 

argyrostomus
Gastropods described in 1758
Taxa named by Carl Linnaeus
Marine gastropods